Syagrus pseudococos is a species of flowering plant in the family Arecaceae. It is found in tropical rainforest and on rocky outcrops in eastern Brazil along a coastal strip from extreme south of state of Bahia south through Espírito Santo, Rio de Janeiro to São Paulo.

It produces quite large fruit and has a full crown. It grows best in rich, well drained soil. It can be distinguished from other species of Syagrus by the pear-shaped form of the fruit. The seeds are also unique among Syagrus in having a
hollow interior to the endosperm, just like a coconut.

It is possibly known as coco verde in California, whereas in Brazil it is known as coco-amargoso or peririma.

References

pseudococos
Endemic flora of Brazil
Least concern plants
Plants described in 1820
Taxonomy articles created by Polbot